The VDL SB250 (originally the DAF SB250) was a full-size low-floor single-decker bus launched in 1997, which was designed specifically for Continental Europe market by DAF.

The SB250 chassis could be fitted with bodywork supplied by fellow VDL Bus & Coach subsidiaries VDL Berkhof, Valkenswaard or Jonckheere), etc.

Like its competitor, the Volvo B7L, the engine was mounted at the left side of the rear overhang (thus the rear door can be located as rearward as possible), but the radiator was mounted on the roof.

A revised version of SB250 was launched in 2004 as the SB250+. The design has received a number of modifications, including the use of the independent front suspension.

References

External links

Product description of VDL SB250+ VDL Bus & Coach

Bus chassis
Full-size buses
Low-floor buses
SB250
Vehicles introduced in 1997